Jim Hackett (8 October 1917 – 13 November 2004) was an Australian cricketer. He played in two first-class matches for Queensland in 1937/38.

See also
 List of Queensland first-class cricketers

References

External links
 

1917 births
2004 deaths
Australian cricketers
Queensland cricketers
Cricketers from Perth, Western Australia